The Latin Grammy Award for Best Urban Music Album is an honor presented annually at the Latin Grammy Awards, a ceremony that recognizes excellence and promotes a wider awareness of cultural diversity and contributions of Latin recording artists in the United States and internationally. According to the category description guide for the 13th Latin Grammy Awards, the award is for vocal or instrumental merengue house, R&B, reggaeton and rap music albums containing at least 51 percent playing time of newly recorded material. The award was first presented as the Best Rap/Hip-Hop Album until it received its current name, Best Urban Music Album, at the 5th Latin Grammy Awards ceremony in 2004.

The accolade for Best Urban Music Album was first presented to the Argentine band Sindicato Argentino del Hip Hop at the second Latin Grammy Awards in 2001 for their album Un Paso a la Eternidad. In 2009, the Puerto Rican duo Calle 13 became the first urban act to be presented with Best Urban Music Album and Album of the Year for their album Los de Atrás Vienen Conmigo (2008).

Residente is the most awarded artist in this category, with five; one solo and four as part of Calle 13. In 2013, Mala Rodríguez became the first female artist and the first Spanish artist to win the award. Puerto Rican singers Tito "El Bambino" and Ivy Queen are tied with the most nominations without a win, with three each.

Winners and nominees

2000s

2010s

2020s

See also
Grammy Award for Best Música Urbana Album
Billboard Latin Music Award for Latin Rhythm Album of the Year
Lo Nuestro Award for Urban Album of the Year

Notes 
 Each year is linked to the article about the Latin Grammy Awards held that year.
 The name of the performer and the nominated album

References

External links 
Official website of the Latin Grammy Awards

 
Awards established in 2001
Urban Music Album